Bordlands is a village in the Parish of Newlands in the Scottish Borders area of Scotland. The former name of Bordlands was Boreland.

See also
List of places in the Scottish Borders
List of places in Scotland

External links
RCAHMS record for Bordlands Estate
RCAHMS record for Fort, Bordlands Rings, Bordlands Hill

Gazetteer for Scotland: Bordlands Hill
Borders Family History Society: Newlands

Villages in the Scottish Borders